Juanita is a 2019 American drama film directed by Clark Johnson, from a screenplay by Roderick M. Spencer, based upon the novel Dancing on the Edge of the Roof by Sheila Williams. It stars Alfre Woodard and Adam Beach.

It was released on March 8, 2019, by Netflix.

Plot

A Columbus, Ohio woman takes a Greyhound bus to Butte, Montana, where she reinvents herself and meets an interesting cast of characters at a French-cuisine restaurant.

Cast

Production
In April 2017, it was announced Woodard, Beach, Blair Underwood, LaTanya Richardson Jackson, Marcus Henderson, Ashlie Atkinson, Tsulan Cooper, and Kat Smith, had joined the cast of the film, with Johnson directing from a screenplay by Roderick M. Spencer, based upon the novel by Sheila Williams. Stephanie Allain, Mel Jones and Jason Michael Berman produced the film under their Homegrown Pictures and Mandalay Pictures banners, respectively.

Filming
Principal photography began in April 2017, in Virginia.

Release
In April 2017, Netflix acquired distribution rights to the film. It was released on March 8, 2019.

Reception
Site's Critics Consensus says: "Juanita's refreshing journey of self-actualization may lead to a predictable destination, but a sterling star turn by Alfre Woodard gives this sojourn an invaluable spark."

Woodard stated that a sequel was being written in an interview on the Kermode & Mayo Film Review podcast on 10 July 2020.

References

External links
 

2019 films
2019 drama films
American independent films
Films based on American novels
English-language Netflix original films
Films shot in Virginia
African-American drama films
Films directed by Clark Johnson
Films about chefs
Films about Native Americans
Films about nurses
Films set in Columbus, Ohio
Films set in Montana
2019 independent films
2010s English-language films
2010s American films